In Buddhism, the three marks of existence are three characteristics (Pali: tilakkhaṇa; Sanskrit: त्रिलक्षण trilakṣaṇa) of all existence and beings, namely aniccā (impermanence), dukkha (commonly translated as "suffering", "unsatisfactory," "unease"), and anattā (without a lasting essence). That humans are subject to delusion about the three marks, that this delusion results in suffering, and that removal of that delusion results in the end of dukkha, is a central theme in the Buddhist Four Noble Truths and Noble Eightfold Path.

Description
The three marks are:
 sabbe saṅkhārā aniccā — all saṅkhāras (conditioned things) are impermanent
 sabbe saṅkhārā dukkhā — all saṅkhāras are unsatisfactory, imperfect, unstable
 sabbe dhammā anattā — all dharmas (conditioned or unconditioned things) have no unchanging self or soul

In the Mahayana Yogācārabhūmi-Śāstra however, four characteristics are described instead of three:

 impermanence (anityākāra)
 suffering (duḥkhākāra)
 emptiness (*śūnyākāra)
 selflessness (anātmākāra)

In the sutra "The Questions of the Nāga King Sāgara" Sāgaranāgarājaparipṛcchā these four marks are defined as:

 all compounded phenomena are impermanent (anitya)
 all contaminated phenomena are without satisfaction (duḥkha)
 all phenomena are without self (anātman)
 nirvāṇa is peaceful/peace (śānta/śānti) 

In the Samyukta Agama a different formulation is made, in which the Buddha taught impermanence, nonself, and nirvana as the Three Dharma Seals. Here nirvana replaces dukkha as the Third Dharma Seal:

 nirvana - "The joy of completely extinguishing our ideas and concepts, rather than suffering, is one of the Three Dharma Seals."

Explanation

Anicca

Impermanence (Pali anicca, Sanskrit anitya) means that all things (saṅkhāra) are in a constant state of flux. Buddhism states that all physical and mental events come into being and dissolve. Human life embodies this flux in the aging process and the cycle of repeated birth and death (Samsara); nothing lasts, and everything decays. This is applicable to all beings and their environs, including beings who are reborn in deva (god) and naraka (hell) realms. This is in contrast to nirvana, the reality that is nicca, or knows no change, decay or death.

Dukkha

Dukkha (Sanskrit duhkha) means  "unsatisfactory," commonly translated as "suffering, pain." Mahasi Sayadaw calls it 'unmanagable, uncontrollable.'

As the First Noble Truth, dukkha is explicated as the physical and mental dissatisfaction of birth, aging, illness, dying; getting what one wishes to avoid or not getting what one wants; and "in short, the five aggregates of grasping" (skandha).. This, however, is a different context, not the Three Marks of Existence, and therefore 'suffering' may not be the best word for it.

The relationship between the three characteristics is explained in the Pali Canon as follows: What is anicca is dukkha. What is dukkha is anatta (Samyutta Nikaya.Vol4.Page1). 

 That which is impermanent is dukkha (i.e. it cannot be made to last). That which is dukkha is not permanent."

Anatta

Anatta (Sanskrit anatman) refers to there is no permanent essence in any thing or phenomena, including living beings.

While anicca and dukkha apply to "all conditioned phenomena" (saṅkhārā), anattā has a wider scope because it applies to all dhammās without "conditioned, unconditioned" qualification. Thus, nirvana too is a state of without Self or anatta. The phrase "sabbe dhamma anatta" includes within its scope each skandha (group of aggregates, heaps) that compose any being, and the belief "I am" is a conceit which must be realized to be impermanent and without substance, to end all dukkha. 

The Anattā doctrine of Buddhism denies that there is anything permanent in any person to call one's Self, and that a belief in a Self is a source of Dukkha.  Some Buddhist traditions and scholars, however, interpret the anatta doctrine to be strictly in regard to the five aggregates rather than a universal truth, despite the Buddha affirming so in his first sermon. Religious studies scholar Alexander Wynne calls anattā a "not-self" teaching rather than a "no-self" teaching.

Application
In Buddhism, ignorance (avidyā, or moha; i.e. a failure to grasp directly) of the three marks of existence is regarded as the first link in the overall process of saṃsāra whereby a being is subject to repeated existences in an endless cycle of dukkha. As a consequence, dissolving that ignorance through direct insight into the three marks is said to bring an end to saṃsāra and, as a result, to that dukkha (dukkha nirodha or nirodha sacca, as described in the third of the Four Noble Truths).

Gautama Buddha taught that all beings conditioned by causes (saṅkhāra) are impermanent (anicca) and suffering (dukkha), and that not-self (anattā) characterises all dhammas, meaning there is no "I", "me", or "mine" in either the conditioned or the unconditioned (i.e. nibbāna). The teaching of three marks of existence in the Pali Canon is credited to the Buddha.

See also
 Ātman
 Existentialism
 Four Dharma Seals
 Index of Buddhism-related articles
 Lakshana
 Secular Buddhism
 Similarities between Pyrrhonism and Buddhism

Notes

References

Sources

 
 

 

 

 

Buddhist philosophical concepts
Buddhist eschatology
Ontology